Lindsay Walters is an American spokesperson and former White House Special Assistant to the President and Deputy Press Secretary.

Education 
Walters attended Archmere Academy and graduated from Drexel University, where she received a Bachelor of Science in marketing, advertising, and public relations from the Bennett S. LeBow College of Business in 2012. While at Drexel, she played on the women's soccer team.

Career 
In 2012, Walters worked for Mitt Romney's presidential campaign.  She left the private sector, where she had worked for the strategic firm The Glover Park Group., to come to Illinois to work in Illinois Republican Bruce Rauner's gubernatorial campaign. Rauner defeated incumbent Democratic governor Pat Quinn in 2014. Walters went on to serve in Rauner's administration as Deputy Press Secretary.

Walters served as the National Spokeswoman at the Republican National Committee. During her tenure at the RNC, she frequently appeared on television, and managed the press engagements for the chairman.

Beginning in January 2017, Walters worked in the Trump Administration as Special Assistant and White House Deputy Press Secretary. where she had a focus on the national economic portfolio. She also traveled extensively on behalf of the White House, managing press corps logistics and briefing reporters aboard Air Force One.

Walters joined Edelman in April 2019. She is currently Vice President, U.S. Public Affairs, at Edelman.

References

External links

Trump administration personnel
Living people
Year of birth missing (living people)
American press secretaries
21st-century American women
American women's soccer players
Soccer players from Pennsylvania
Women's association football goalkeepers
Drexel Dragons women's soccer players